John Hicks (1904–1989) was an English economist. 

John Hicks may also refer to:

Politics
John Hicks (politician) (1715–1790), land agent and politician in Nova Scotia
John F. Hicks, American diplomat, United States Ambassador to Eritrea
John Hickes (politician), MP for Oxford

Sports
John Hicks (American football) (1951–2016), lineman
John Hicks (baseball) (born 1989)
John Hicks (cricketer) (1850–1912)
John Hicks (field hockey) (born 1938)

Other
John Hicks (pianist) (1941–2006), American jazz pianist and composer
John Hickes (minister), or Hicks, English nonconformist minister
John Braxton Hicks (1823–1897), British obstetrician
John Sydney Hicks (1864–1931), British doctor
John J. Hicks (died 1997), director of National Photographic Interpretation Center
John R. Hicks (1956–2005), American murderer 
John V. Hicks (1907–1999), English/Canadian poet and accountant, Saskatchewan Order of Merit
John W. Hicks (1921–2002), president of Purdue University, 1982–1983

See also
Jon Hicks (disambiguation)
Jack Hicks (1939–2008), photographer
John Hick (1922–2012), theologian